The 2023 America East Women's Basketball Conference tournament was the postseason men's basketball tournament for the America East Conference that began on March 1, 2023 and ended on March 10, 2023. All tournament games were played on the home arenas of the higher-seeded school. By defeating the Albany Great Danes in the championship game, the Vermont Catamounts earned the conference's automatic bid to the 2023 NCAA Tournament

Seeds 
Eight of the nine America East teams will contest the tournament. 

Tiebrekers will be applied as needed to determine seeding.

Schedule

Bracket

See also 

 2023 America East men's basketball tournament
 America East Conference women's basketball tournament

References 

America East women's basketball tournament
America East Conference women's basketball tournament
2022–23 America East Conference women's basketball season